Andrew Simon Neate (born 19 August 1974 in Aylesbury) is a British former racing driver.

Racing career
After first racing in karting, he drove in Formula First in 1997. In 1999 he went on to the Formula Opel Europa Cup and a year later he drove in the Ford Fiesta Championship. He drove in some rounds of the Production class for the BTCC in a Team CAM Mitsubishi Carisma. For 2002 he moved up to the British GT Championship, driving a Marcos Mantis. In 2004 he joined the TOCA tour with both the Renault Clio Cup and the SEAT Cupra Championship. He got a drive in 2005, in the British Touring Car Championship for Team Nuts with Daniels Motorsport in a former works Vauxhall Astra Coupe. He only drove in three rounds, finishing eighteenth in the championship with one point. In 2006 he won the Ford Fiesta Championship title, and finished first in class at the Britcar 24 Hours in a Honda Civic Type R, as well as driving at Silverstone in the SEAT Cupra Championship. A year later he raced again in the SEATs, Fiestas and the Britcar 24 in a Mosler GT3 RS where he finished second. He drove in two rounds of the Porsche Carrera Cup Great Britain for Red Line Racing.

2008 accident
At the start of the 2008 Britcar 24 Hours at Silverstone, he was involved in a serious accident at the start of the race. He suffered terrible injuries including a broken neck from which he spent the next eighteen months recovering. He was in talks with West Surrey Racing to drive a BMW 320si in the BTCC in 2009 prior to the Britcar event, but the deal could not be completed due to his injury.

BTCC return
After recovering from his injury, Neate completed a deal to drive for WSR in the 2010 British Touring Car Championship season. Neate is the Chief Technology Officer for WSR team sponsors Ceravision. At Oulton Park he finished 9th, but was disqualified for causing an avoidable accident with Andrew Jordan.

For the 2011 season, Neate switched to Team Aon in the 'Global' Ford Focus, partnering Tom Chilton and Tom Onslow-Cole. 2011 was another difficult year for Neate, he struggled to score points and was involved in many accidents. However, he qualified third at Oulton Park but lost many positions during the first race and only finished ninth, on the last lap he was involved in a major collision with Jeff Smith which resulted in the car of Tom Boardman being written off after he was collected by Smith. At Rockingham, Neate was fined £1,500 for using abusive language towards Alex MacDowall after a dispute over an incident on track. His pace improved during the Brands Hatch meeting, however he lost out on a podium position after losing control of his car.

For the 2012 season, Neate joined the new manufacturer MG team run by Triple Eight Race Engineering alongside Jason Plato. He had another unsuccessful season, finishing sixteenth in the championship whilst his teammate Plato finished third. During the off-season it was confirmed that Neate would not be driving for the MG team in 2013, although he will remain in the championship. On 9 January it was announced that Neate was forming his own team for the 2013 season, and would drive a NGTC-specification Chevrolet Cruze.

The programme wouldn't continue for a second year with the Chevrolet being sold on to Laser Tools Racing for the 2014 season and it would be 2016 before Neate returned to the championship after agreeing a deal to join Team Dynamics in an expanded three-car team. However, Neate would compete in just one meeting before splitting with the team, citing a "lack of full commitment and focus on the job".

Neate rejoined the grid in 2020 with Motorbase Performance in a Ford Focus but endured a tough season that included being excluded from the Thruxton meeting for a clash with Carl Boardley. At the end of the season, Neate re-signed for a second season, hoping that a full pre-season testing programme would provide the chance to fight for improved results on track.

Personal life
His son Aiden Neate is also a racing driver, currently racing in the British and French F4 championships.

Racing record

Complete British Touring Car Championship results
(key) Races in bold indicate pole position (1 point awarded – 2001 all races, 2005–present just for first race, 2001 in class) Races in italics indicate fastest lap (1 point awarded all races, 2001 in class) * signifies that driver lead race for at least one lap (1 point awarded all races)

Britcar 24 Hour results

References

External links
 Official website (under construction)
 BTCC Racing Profile

Living people
British Touring Car Championship drivers
1974 births
Sportspeople from Aylesbury
Porsche Carrera Cup GB drivers
Britcar 24-hour drivers
Renault UK Clio Cup drivers
Arena Motorsport drivers